Tango v svilenih coklah is a novel by Slovenian author Ted Kramolc. It was first published in 2002.

See also
List of Slovenian novels

References
Galerija literarnih portretov, Dnevnik.si, accessed 19 July 2012

Slovenian novels
2002 novels